Zumiao Station, is a metro station on Guangfo Line (FMetro Line 1), which will be the future interchange station between Guangfo Line (FMetro Line 1) and FMetro Line 5. It is located under Jianxin Road east of its junction with Zumiao Road in the Chancheng District of Foshan, near the Foshan Ancestral Temple. The station lies in the central business district of Foshan old city and was completed on 3November 2010.

Station layout

Exits

References

Foshan Metro stations
Railway stations in China opened in 2010
Guangzhou Metro stations